WASP-95 is a star in the constellation Grus. With an apparent magnitude of 10.1, it is not visible to the naked eye. Its spectral type of G2 means it is a yellow sunlike star.

Planetary system
In 2013, a planet was discovered around WASP-95. The planet, WASP-95b, is a hot Jupiter about 10% more massive than Jupiter, and completes an orbit round its star every two days. It was discovered by its transit of the star in 2013. The planet equilibrium temperature is 1692.6 K.

References

G-type main-sequence stars
Grus (constellation)
Planetary systems with one confirmed planet
Durchmusterung objects